, is a Japanese musician, best known as the leading vocalist and songwriter for the band Galileo Galilei. In 2014, he began releasing solo material. He announced the new band "Bird Bear Hare and Fish" on his solo concert on January 27. He released his first full length solo album "warbear" in December 2017.

Biography 

Yuuki Ozaki was born in Wakkanai, Hokkaido in 1991. At junior high school in 2007, he formed the band Galileo Galilei, and in 2008 won the Senkō Riot music contest, as well as an independent music contract. After releasing the extended play Ame Nochi Galileo (2009), the band made their major label debut under SME Records with the EP Hamanasu no Hana (2010). As a member of Galileo Galilei, he has released four albums: Parade (2011), Portal (2012), Alarms (2013), Sea and the Darkness (2016).

Ozaki collaborated with Vocaloid producer Livetune to create the opening theme song for the anime Hamatora, "Flat", which was released in early 2014. In mid 2014, Ozaki collaborated with anime composer Yoko Kanno to create "Trigger", the opening theme song for the anime Terror in Resonance. Ozaki with his band frequently collaborate with Aimer, the singer who performed the ending theme song for the anime, where she provides vocal for "Bananafish Hamabe to Kuroi Niiji" in their fourth EP See More Glass and "Bed" in their fourth and final full-length album Sea and the Darkness. Ozaki was featured on the song "Nemuri no Mori", from his extended play Dareka, Umi o'',
Yuuki later announced while he was on tour that he is in a new band called Bird Bear Hare and Fish.

Discography
Albums

Singles

Notes

References

External links 

Official website for Galileo Galilei

Yuuki Ozaki on Instagram

1991 births
Living people
Japanese guitarists
Musicians from Hokkaido
21st-century Japanese singers
21st-century guitarists
21st-century Japanese male singers